Kamila Frątczak (born 25 November 1979) is a Polish volleyball player, a member of Poland women's national volleyball team.

She competed at the 2001 Women’s European Volleyball Championship, and 2003 Women’s European Volleyball Championship, winning a gold medal.

Clubs 

 MKS MOS Turek  1995/96 
 Augusto Kalisz — 1996/97–1998/1999
 Calisia Kalisz — 1999/2000–2001/2002
 Winiary Kalisz — 2002/2003–2003/2004
 Modena Volley — 2004/2005
 Priamidea. Com Tortoli — 2005/2006
 Europea 92 Isernia — 2006/2007
 Muszynianka Fakro Muszyna — 2007/2008
 Muszynianka Fakro Muszyna — 2008/2009

References

External links 

 

1979 births
Living people
Polish women's volleyball players
European Games medalists in volleyball